John Millmore (26 March 1859 – ?) was a United States Navy sailor and a recipient of the United States military's highest decoration, the Medal of Honor.

Born on 26 March 1859 in New York, New York, Millmore joined the Navy from that state in January 1876. On that day, he and another sailor, First Class Fireman Henry Lakin Simpson, rescued their shipmate Ordinary Seaman John W. Powers from drowning. For this action, both Millmore and Simpson were awarded the Medal of Honor seven years later, on October 18, 1884. 

Millmore's official Medal of Honor citation reads:
Serving on board the U.S.S. Essex, Millmore rescued from drowning John W. Powers, ordinary seaman, serving on the same vessel with him, at Monrovia, Liberia, 31 October 1877.

Millmore's medal is held by the American Numismatic Society.

See also

List of Medal of Honor recipients during peacetime

References

External links

1859 births
Year of death missing
Military personnel from New York City
United States Navy sailors
United States Navy Medal of Honor recipients
Non-combat recipients of the Medal of Honor